The 1972–73 season was the 22nd competition for the FDGB-Pokal, the national football cup competition of East Germany.

As the second-tier DDR-Liga had been enlarged to 58 teams in the previous season, the competition had to be held in a new format. The first round proper was held — after a play-off between Zentronik Sömmerda and HFC Chemie II — with 72 teams: 15 Bezirkspokal winners (designated with an asterisk), 55 DDR-Liga teams and the two teams relegated from the DDR-Oberliga in the 1971–72 season, Stahl Riesa and Vorwärts Stralsund.

After an intermediate round that saw the seven remaining Bezirkspokal winners and the 29 surviving DDR-Liga teams, the 14 current DDR-Oberliga teams joined in the second round proper. Only two Bezirkspokal winners (Wismut Gera II and Fortschritt Krumhermersdorf) took part in this round, together with 16 second-tier teams. Both Bezirkspokal winners were eliminated, as well as three top-flight teams: Sachsenring Zwickau, Vorwärts Frankfurt and Wismut Aue.

In contrast to the first rounds, the fixtures in the round of last 16, the quarter- and semi-finals were played over two legs. If scores were level, extra time and a penalty shoot-out followed. The away goals rule was applied as well.

The reserve team of F.C. Hansa Rostock was the only second-tier club not eliminated in the round of last 16 and thus the club entered the quarter-finals with two teams. Hansa had eliminated defending champions FC Carl Zeiss Jena, but went out in the quarter final against 1. FC Magdeburg. Last year's finalist and new DDR-Oberliga champion Dynamo Dresden went out in the quarter finals against 1. FC Lokomotive Leipzig who went on to beat Berliner FC Dynamo to reach the final against 1. FC Magdeburg in Dessau. Magdeburg had beaten fellow DDR-Oberliga side FC Rot-Weiß Erfurt to secure their fourth final appearance since 1964 (as SC Aufbau Magdeburg).

Play-off

1st round proper

Intermediate round

2nd round proper

Round of last 16

Quarterfinals

Semifinals

Final

Statistics

Match report 

The 22nd FDGB-Pokal final saw two DDR-Oberliga teams face each other. Magdeburg were lying in third place while Leipzig occupied the 8th rank. But in the match Lokomotive Leipzig began with a powerful attacking run on Magdeburg's goal. They were rewarded with the early lead when Frenzel scored off Matoul's header. Ten minutes later Magdeburg's Achtel scratched the ball off the goal line. This was a wake-up call for FCM who now had their first opportunity, but Sparwasser missed narrowly in the 18th minute. Just one minute later, Magdeburg sweeper Zapf did better and headed home a Seguin corner. The match now turned in Magdeburg's favor, with their defense gaining control over Leipzig's forwards Matoul and Frenzel and on the other hand their forward Sparwasser becoming more and more of a threat to his opponent Geisler. Consequently, it was Sparwasser who put Magdeburg in the lead after a through ball from Enge. Leipzig's spirit thus rekindled led to an equaliser after Enge's backpass was intercepted by Leipzig's Altmann. Both teams now showed their willingness to end the game in regular time with opportunities on both sides. Three minutes before the end of 90 minutes Magdeburg's Enge and Sparwasser again started a nice attacking move. Defender Enge started his run at his own goal line, crossed immaculately to Sparwasser, and the striker scored the winning goal, earning his club the fourth FDGB-Pokal title after 1964, 1965 and 1969.

1972-73
East
Cup